1930 Lucifer, provisional designation , is a carbonaceous asteroid from the outer regions of the asteroid belt, approximately 34 kilometers in diameter. It was discovered on 29 October 1964, by American astronomer Elizabeth Roemer at the Flagstaff station (NOFS) of the United States Naval Observatory (USNO). It is named after Lucifer, the "shining one" or "light-bearer" from the Hebrew Bible.

Orbit 

Lucifer orbits the Sun in the outer main-belt at a distance of 2.5–3.3 AU once every 4 years and 11 months (1,802 days). Its orbit has an eccentricity of 0.14 and an inclination of 14° with respect to the ecliptic.

Physical characteristics

Spectral type 

In the SMASS taxonomy, Lucifer is a Cgh-type that belongs to the carbonaceous C-group of asteroids.

Diameter and albedo 

According to the surveys carried out by the Infrared Astronomical Satellite IRAS, the Japanese Akari satellite, and NASA's Wide-field Infrared Survey Explorer with its subsequent NEOWISE mission, Lucifer measures between 27.00 and 39.61 kilometers in diameter, and its surface has an albedo between 0.05 and 0.1058. The Collaborative Asteroid Lightcurve Link derives an albedo of 0.0886 and calculates a diameter of 26.90 kilometers based on an absolute magnitude of 11.1.

Rotation and pole axis 

In October 2003, a rotational lightcurve of Lucifer was obtained from photometric observations by American astronomer Brian Warner at his Palmer Divide Observatory in Colorado. Lightcurve analysis gave a well-defined rotation period of 13.056 hours with a brightness amplitude of 0.44 magnitude.

In January 2005, observations by astronomer Horacio Correia gave a concurring period of 13.054 hours and an amplitude of 0.22 magnitude. In 2013, another lightcurve was obtained at the Palomar Transient Factory, and a modeled lightcurve from various data sources, including the AstDyS database, gave another concurring period of 13.0536 hours and found a pole of (32.0°,17.0°).

Naming 

Lutz D. Schmadel's Dictionary of Minor Planet Names reads "Named for the proud, rebellious archangel, identified with Satan, who was expelled from heaven". The official  was published by the Minor Planet Center on 1 August 1978.

References

External links 
 Lightcurve plot of 1930 Lucifer, Palmer Divide Observatory, B. D. Warner (2003)
 Asteroid Lightcurve Database (LCDB), query form (info )
 Dictionary of Minor Planet Names, Google books
 Asteroids and comets rotation curves, CdR – Observatoire de Genève, Raoul Behrend
 Discovery Circumstances: Numbered Minor Planets (1)-(5000) – Minor Planet Center
 
 

001930
Discoveries by Elizabeth Roemer
Named minor planets
001930
19641029